The open front unrounded vowel, or low front unrounded vowel, is a type of vowel sound used in some spoken languages. It is one of the eight primary cardinal vowels, not directly intended to correspond to a vowel sound of a specific language but rather to serve as a fundamental reference point in a phonetic measuring system.

However, the accuracy of the quadrilateral vowel chart is disputed, and the sound has been analyzed acoustically as extra-open at a position where the front/back distinction has lost its significance.

In practice, the symbol  is often used to represent an open central unrounded vowel. This is the usual practice, for example, in the historical study of the English language. The loss of separate symbols for open and near-open front vowels is usually considered unproblematic, because the perceptual difference between the two is quite small, and very few languages contrast the two.

The Hamont-Achel dialect of Limburgish has been reported to contrast long open front, central and back unrounded vowels. This is extremely unusual.

Features

 This subsumes central open (central low) vowels because the tongue does not have as much flexibility in positioning as it does in the mid and close (high) vowels; the difference between an open front vowel and an open back vowel is similar to the difference between a close front and a close central vowel, or a close central and a close back vowel.

Occurrence
Many languages have some form of an unrounded open vowel. For languages that have only a single open vowel, the symbol for this vowel  may be used because it is the only open vowel whose symbol is part of the basic Latin alphabet. Whenever marked as such, the vowel is closer to a central  than to a front . However, there may not actually be much of a difference. (See Vowel#Acoustics.)

Notes

References

External links 
 

Open vowels
Front vowels
Unrounded vowels